Pethia punctata is a species of cyprinid fish found in streams and ponds of the Western Ghats of India. There have also been unconfirmed reports that it is also present in Sri Lanka. This species can reach a length of  TL.

References

Pethia
Barbs (fish)
Fish described in 1865